Dobrușa is a commune in Șoldănești District, Moldova. It is composed of three villages: Dobrușa, Recești and Zahorna.

References

Communes of Șoldănești District